The Otto Stern School (OSS) is the platform for doctoral education in natural sciences at the Johann Wolfgang Goethe University Frankfurt am Main.

Organisation 
The Otto Stern School was founded in 2006 as a scientific centre of the Goethe University. It offers support and sponsorship for its members. Doctoral candidates and their supervising teams (professors and, as second or third supervisor, postdocs) can become members if they belong to one of the natural sciences faculties or PhD programmes and Collaborate Research Centres of the Goethe University, e.g.:
International Helmholtz Graduate School
 Frankfurt International School of Science (FIGSS)
 DFG Priority Programme Genom organisation and Genom expression in Archaea
 Collaborative Research Center Functional Membrane Proteomics
 International Max Planck Research School for Structure and Function of Biological Membrane
 Research Training Group Neuronal Plasticity
 Research unit RIFT Dynamics
 Research unit Spin and Charge correlations in low-dimensional metallorganic solid state
 Research unit Ecological and Cultural Change in West and Central Africa

Institutions of the Otto Stern School are the Council, consisting of representatives of the respective faculties, PhD programmes, supervisors and doctoral candidates, the Directorate, the Quality-Assurance Board, the Admission Committees, the Chairperson, the Management and the Ombudsperson.

Responsibilities 
 To support the doctoral education in natural sciences at the Goethe University and thus current and future research.
 To introduce international standards and a common structure in doctoral education for an even higher professional approach.
 To ensure the quality of doctoral education.
 To prepare doctoral candidates and young scientists for challenges in research and economy - during the dissertation phase and beyond.
 To accompany international candidates through their first weeks in Germany.
This is accomplished by three main offers: A Target Agreement is concluded between doctoral candidates, supervisors and the OSS, which limits the dissertation project to 3-3.5 years and arranges regular meetings of the candidate and the supervising team. 
Furthermore, the OSS offers workshops for doctoral candidates and, if desired, supervisors to convey key skills in research (e.g. scientific presentation), organisation (e.g. time management and communication strategies) and career planning (e.g. application training). English and German language courses are also part of this programme.
Also funding options like travel grants, start-up scholarships and child-care subsidies are awarded to foster international and interdisciplinary research in the natural sciences of the Goethe University.

Admission Requirements 
 Admission as doctoral candidates by one of the natural sciences faculties of the Goethe University 
 Master's degree or equivalent with an average above the German “gut” (2.5) 
 English Skills at Level B2
 For Non-Native Speakers: German Skills at Level A1
 Joint Supervision: at least 2 supervisors, one of which must be a member of a faculty

External links 
 www.oss.uni-frankfurt.de

Goethe University Frankfurt
Educational institutions established in 2006
2006 establishments in Germany